The following is a list of notable individuals who were born in and/or have lived in Hutchinson, Kansas.

Academia

 Jane Smisor Bastien (1936–2018), music teacher and author
 Dale L. Boger (1953– ), organic chemist
 L. H. Hausam (1870–1941), president of the Hausam School of Penmanship and founder of Great Western Business and Normal College
 William Lee Miller (1926–2012), historian, political ethics professor
 Erik N. Rasmussen (1957– ), atmospheric scientist and tornado expert
 Fred Soper (1893–1977), epidemiologist
 Howard Swearer (1932–1991), educator
 Pat Woodrum (1941– ), librarian

Arts and entertainment

Fashion
 Julie Woodson (1950– ), model

Film, television, and theatre
 Kay Alden (1946– ), screenwriter
 Mitch Brian (1961– ), screenwriter
 Aneta Corsaut (1933–1995), actress
 Racquel Darrian (1968– ), pornographic actress
 Lucinda Dickey (1960– ), actress, dancer
 Richard Thorpe (1896–1991), film director

Journalism
 Michael Grant (1951– ), journalist
 Fred Kaplan (1954– ), author, journalist
 James B. Steele (1943– ), author, journalist

Literature
 Scott Heim (1966– ), novelist
 Margaret St. Clair (1911–1995), science fiction writer, novelist
 William Mark Simmons (1953– ), broadcaster, novelist
 William Stafford (1914–1993), poet, pacifist

Music 
 James Avery (1937–2009), conductor, pianist
 Jock Bartley, guitarist
 Steven Stucky (1949– ), composer
 Murry Wilson (1917–1973), record producer, songwriter. Father to three Beach Boys performers.

Other visual arts
 Charles Stafford Duncan (1892–1952), artist
 John Newsom (1970– ), painter

Business
 James Barnett (1986– ), entrepreneur, activist
 David Dillon (1951– ), business executive
 Hal Prewitt (1954– ), technology entrepreneur, inventor, race car driver, artist, photographer

Crime
 Edward J. Adams (1887–1921), bank robber

Military
 Robert S. Lucas (1930– ), U.S. Coast Guard Rear Admiral
 Alexander Pearson Jr., U.S. Army First Lieutenant 
 Fay B. Prickett, U.S. Army major general

Politics

National
 Leland Barrows (1906–1988), U.S. Ambassador to Cameroon and Togo
 Wesley E. Brown (1907–2012), U.S. federal judge
 William R. Brown (1840–1916), U.S. Representative from Kansas
 Ralph Easley (1856–1939), political activist
 Martha Keys (1930– ), U.S. Representative from Kansas
 Richard T. Morrison (1967– ), U.S. tax court judge
 Scott W. Stucky (1948– ), U.S. appeals court judge
 Jasper N. Tincher (1878–1951), U.S. Representative from Kansas
 Kevin Yoder (1976– ), U.S. Representative from Kansas

State
 Terry Bruce (1975– ), Kansas legislator
 Jack M. Campbell (1916–1999), 21st Governor of New Mexico
 John F. Hayes (1919–2010), Kansas legislator
 Walter A. Huxman (1887–1972), 27th Governor of Kansas, U.S. federal judge
 Dick Kraus (1937–2019), Massachusetts legislator
 Jay La Suer (1940– ), California legislator
 B. Robert Lewis (1931–1979), Minnesota state legislator and veterinarian
 William Yoast Morgan (1866–1932), Lieutenant Governor of Kansas
 Michael O'Neal (1951– ), Kansas legislator

Local
 Robert L. Burns (1876–1955), attorney; business manager of The Hutchinson News; Hutchinson school board, city council and school board for Los Angeles, California

Sports

American football
 Geneo Grissom (1992– ), defensive lineman
 Ben Heeney, linebacker
 Ken Huff (1953– ), offensive lineman
 Buck Pierce (1981– ), quarterback
 Pat Ryan (1955– ), quarterback
 Tommy Thompson (1916–1989), quarterback

Baseball
 Jack Banta (1925–2006), pitcher for the Brooklyn Dodgers of Major League Baseball

 Joyce Barnes (1925–2017), All-American Girls Professional Baseball League player
 Andy Dirks (1986– ), outfielder with the Detroit Tigers of Major League Baseball

Basketball
 Jamie Carey (1981– ), Former WNBA guard for the Connecticut Sun

Fictional residents
 Sam "Squid" Dullard, character on Rocket Power, moves to fictional California town featured in the show in the first episode, revealed in a later episode that he's from Hutchinson

See also

 Lists of people from Kansas

References

Hutchinson, Kansas
Hutchinson